Vilgunn Gregusson (born 1936) is a Norwegian civil servant and politician.  She served as the County Governor of Troms county from 2000 until 2005 (although from 2000 to 2002 it was as "acting" governor).

References

1936 births
County governors of Norway
Living people